Geodia amphistrongyla is a species of sponge in the family Geodiidae. The species is found in the tropical Pacific Ocean and was first described by Robert J. Lendlmayer von Lendenfeld in 1910.

References

Tetractinellida
Sponges described in 1910